Richard Robson may refer to:
Richard Robson (politician), Australian politician
Richard Robson (chemist) (born 1937), Australian professor in chemistry
Richard Robson, producer of "Imagination"

See also
Richard Bateman-Robson (1753–1827), English MP
Richard Robinson (disambiguation)